Phoebe nivea is a species of beetle in the family Cerambycidae. It was described by Lacordaire in 1872. It is known from Brazil.

References

Hemilophini
Beetles described in 1872